55th National Board of Review Awards
December 14, 1983

The 55th National Board of Review Awards were announced on December 14, 1983.

Top Ten Films 
Betrayal, Terms of Endearment
Educating Rita
Tender Mercies
The Dresser
The Right Stuff
Testament
Local Hero
The Big Chill
Cross Creek
Yentl

Top Foreign Films 
Fanny and Alexander
The Return of Martin Guerre
That Night in Varennes
La traviata
Boat People

Winners 
Best Film: Betrayal, Terms of Endearment
Best Foreign Film: Fanny and Alexander
Best Actor: Tom Conti (Reuben, Reuben, Merry Christmas, Mr. Lawrence)
Best Actress: Shirley MacLaine (Terms of Endearment)
Best Supporting Actor: Jack Nicholson (Terms of Endearment)
Best Supporting Actress: Linda Hunt (The Year of Living Dangerously)
Best Director: James L. Brooks (Terms of Endearment)
Career Achievement Award: Gregory Peck

External links 
 National Board of Review of Motion Pictures :: Awards for 1983

1983
1983 film awards
1983 in American cinema